"Like a Hurricane" is a song written by Neil Young in 1975 and first released on the album American Stars 'n Bars in 1977.

History
There is a story that Young wrote the song in July 1975 with the help of his friend and La Honda neighbor Taylor Phelps in the back of his DeSoto Suburban, during a time when Young was unable to sing because of an operation on his vocal cords. Driven by Young's trademark fierce guitars, the song became a landmark of the 'electric side' of his concerts. The song has been played on nearly every tour Young has done since its release. It has also appeared on the compilations Decade and Greatest Hits and on the live albums Live Rust, Weld, Unplugged (this rendition is played almost entirely on a pump organ) and Way Down in the Rust Bucket.

An edited version of "Like a Hurricane" was released as a single on August 8, 1977, with "Hold Back the Tears" as B-side.

Composition
The melody of Like a Hurricane was inspired by Del Shannon's 1961 song Runaway.

Reception
Cash Box said that "the melodies are carried by Young's voice and guitar, all brought into focus against a distant landscape of multi-layered string effects."

Cover versions
Recorded for music release:

 Roxy Music released their live version of the song, recorded at the Glasgow Apollo in 1982, on the 1983 EP The High Road and the live LP Heart Still Beating.
 The song was also covered by The Mission on their second single "Garden of Delight". It was later included on the album The First Chapter (a compilation of their first singles) and Ever After - Live. 
 Jay Farrar, backed by country-rock band Canyon, covered this song on his live album Stone, Steel, & Bright Lights. 
 Heather Nova recorded the song at a 1995 concert in Hiroshima, released on import-only CDs Maybe An Angel (Japan) and Truth & Bone (Germany).
 Jeff Healey covered the song on his 2008 album Mess of Blues.
 The Coal Porters covered the song on the 2010 album Durango.
 Adam Sandler covered the song on the 2009 album Covered, A Revolution in Sound, of Warner Brothers artists performing cover songs. He also performed the song on the Late Show with David Letterman, to promote the release.
 Jason Isbell and The 400 Unit covered the song on the 2012 album Live From Alabama.
 New Orleans singer Theresa Andersson sings it in the 2006 film New Orleans Music in Exile.
In 2018, Pony Boy (the recording pseudonym of Los Angeles singer-songwriter Marchelle Bradanini) covered the song on a split 7-inch single with Australian singer Emma Swift, on which both musicians covered Neil Young songs.

Personnel
 Neil Young – lead guitar and lead vocals
 Frank "Poncho" Sampedro – Stringman synthesizer and background vocals
 Billy Talbot – bass guitar and background vocals
 Ralph Molina – drums and background vocals

See also
 The Unplugged Collection, Volume One

References

External links

 Like a Hurricane (Adobe Flash) at MySpace (streamed copy where licensed)

1975 songs
1977 singles
Neil Young songs
Reprise Records singles
Songs written by Neil Young
Roxy Music songs
Song recordings produced by David Briggs (record producer)
Song recordings produced by Neil Young
Crazy Horse (band) songs